"Victoria's Secret" is a song by American singer-songwriter Jax, and produced by Jesse Siebenberg and Mark Nilan. It was released in June 2022 to all streaming platforms, after being previously teased on TikTok and performed at Governors Ball Music Festival earlier that month. The song has charted internationally.

Background 
On June 8, Jax posted a video to social media in which she played a snippet of a new song she had written for a child she was babysitting: 

Jax also further claimed that her intention was not to single out a specific brand, but rather to highlight the overarching conversation that needed to take place about the beauty and fashion industries.

On August 11, 2022, Amy Hauk, CEO of Victoria's Secret, posted a statement to the company's Instagram account, claiming that the song resonated with her and that the company had "no excuses for the past" and that she was "committed to building a community where everyone feels seen and respected." Upon seeing the post, Jax posted a video to TikTok replying that her intention was never to "take down a brand".

Furthermore, the song coincided with a Hulu television documentary titled Victoria's Secret: Angels and Demons that premiered on July 14, 2022. Jax stated that the timing of the release was simply a "crazy coincidence".

On August 18, 2022, Jax performed the song on Today.

Composition 
In it, Jax calls out Victoria's Secret and its founder and former CEO, billionaire Leslie Wexner for profiting off women's insecurities and contributing to their negative body image, singing "I know Victoria's secret/And girl, you wouldn't believe/She's an old man who lives in Ohio/Making money off of girls like me/Cashing in on body issues/Selling skin and bones with big boobs".

Chart performance 
For the week ending August 6, 2022, "Victoria's Secret" debuted at number 10 on Billboards Bubbling Under Hot 100 before debuting at number 83 on the Hot 100 the following week, later rising to a peak of 35. The song also peaked at number 69 on the Australian ARIA Singles Chart, 46 on the Canadian Hot 100, 25 on the New Zealand Hot Singles chart, 41 on the UK Singles Chart, and 109 on the Global 200.

Reception 
The song has been praised by celebrities such as Jamie Otis, Rosie O'Donnell and Howie Mandel, and has been used in TikTok videos by Jacqueline Jossa and Maisie Smith among other users of the app.

Charts

Weekly charts

Year-end charts

Certifications

References 

2022 singles
2022 songs
Body image in popular culture
Atlantic Records singles
Protest songs
Songs about consumerism
Songs with feminist themes
Songs about Ohio
Victoria's Secret